Brian Shenton (15 March 1927 – 9 May 1987) was a track and field sprinter. He represented Great Britain in the men's 200 metres and men's 4x100 metres relay at two consecutive Summer Olympics (1952 and 1956).

Born in Doncaster from a working-class background, he was a member of the Doncaster Plant Works Athletic Club, later having a successful career in the City and reaching the position of Chairman of Noble Lowndes.  He died in a car crash soon after retirement.

Shenton came to public attention in 1950 with a series of good performances, culminating in a place at the European Championships as a replacement.  Described as the "boy from nowhere", he set a new personal best in the semi-finals of 21.6s, in the finals beating off the challenge of Étienne Bally.

He won the gold medal at the 1950 European Athletics Championships in Brussels, Belgium in the men's 200 metres in a time of 21.5s as part of the British team that first topped the medal table with a medal count that would not be matched for a further 40 years. 
Representing England he won the silver medal at the 1950 British Empire Games in Auckland, New Zealand, in the 4x110 yard relay and won an individual silver medal in the 220 yard dash at the 1954 British Empire and Commonwealth Games in Vancouver, British Columbia, Canada.

He won the silver medal at the 1954 European Athletics Championships in Berne, Switzerland in the men's 4x100 metres relay, alongside George Ellis, Kenneth Jones and Kenneth Box.

In 1957 Brian Shenton was timed as having set the English 100 yards native record in a time of 9.7 seconds.  However, this was disallowed following a ruling that he had had a "flier".  Shenton appealed and received a personal hearing at the AAA.

Memorabilia from Brian Shenton's athletic career was included in an exhibition of Doncaster's local Olympians in celebration of the London 2012 Olympics.

References

1927 births
1987 deaths
Sportspeople from Doncaster
British male sprinters
English male sprinters
Olympic athletes of Great Britain
Athletes (track and field) at the 1952 Summer Olympics
Athletes (track and field) at the 1956 Summer Olympics
European Athletics Championships medalists
Athletes (track and field) at the 1950 British Empire Games
Athletes (track and field) at the 1954 British Empire and Commonwealth Games
Commonwealth Games medallists in athletics
Commonwealth Games silver medallists for England
Medallists at the 1950 British Empire Games
Medallists at the 1954 British Empire and Commonwealth Games